Walter Bennett (17 April 1901 – 1988) was an English footballer who played in the Football League for Bristol City, Chelsea and Southend United.

References

1901 births
1988 deaths
English footballers
Association football midfielders
English Football League players
Chelsea F.C. players
Southend United F.C. players
Doncaster Rovers F.C. players
Portsmouth F.C. players
Gainsborough Trinity F.C. players
Bristol City F.C. players
Ballymena F.C. players